Swan upping is an annual ceremony in England in which mute swans on the River Thames are rounded up, caught, ringed, and then released.

History
By prerogative right, the British Crown enjoys ownership of all unmarked mute swans in open water. Rights over swans may, however, be granted to a British subject by the Crown (accordingly they may also be claimed by prescription). The ownership of swans in a given body of water was commonly granted to landowners up to the 16th century. The only bodies still to exercise such rights are two livery companies of the City of London. Thus the ownership of swans in the Thames is shared equally among the Crown, the Vintners' Company and the Dyers' Company. 

The Crown's swans are recorded by the Marker of the Swans who is rowed in a skiff by oarsmen from the Company of Watermen and Lightermen.

Description
Swan upping is the traditional means by which the swans on the Thames are apportioned among the three proprietors. Its main practical purposes today are to conduct a census of swans and check their health. It occurs annually in the third week of July. Over five days, the Crown's, Vintners' and the Dyers' respective swan uppers row up the river in skiffs (in recent centuries from Sunbury-on-Thames to Abingdon on Thames).  Swans caught by the Crown's swan uppers under the direction of the Swan Marker are left unmarked, except for a lightweight ring linked to the database of the British Trust for Ornithology. Those caught by the Dyers and Vintners receive a similar ring on the other leg. Originally, rather than being ringed, swans' bills would be nicked using a metal implement, a practice reflected in the pub name The Swan with Two Necks in the City connected with the Vintners, a corruption of "The Swan with Two Nicks".

On 20 July 2009, Queen Elizabeth II, as "Seigneur of the Swans," attended the Swan Upping ceremony for the only time in her reign. This was the only time that the monarch had personally watched the ceremony in centuries.

Cancellations
In 2012, exceptional high river flows for summer prompted a partial cancellation: between Sunbury-on-Thames and Windsor, the first definitively known cancellation (albeit partial) in its 900-year history.

The first known full cancellation took place in 2020 due to COVID-19 social distancing measures.

See also
 Royal fish
 Royal Swans

References

 Norman Frederic Ticehurst, The Mute Swan in England: Its History, and the Ancient Custom of Swan Keeping (1957).

External links

 The Royal Windsor website
 The official British Monarchy website - Swan Upping
 Vintners' Company website
 Swan Upping at Cookham

British monarchy
Swans
Culture associated with the River Thames
English traditions
Ceremonies in the United Kingdom
July events